So This Is Paris is a 1954 Technicolor romantic musical comedy film directed by Richard Quine. It stars Tony Curtis (in his only film musical) and Gloria DeHaven.

Plot 
Joe, Al and Davy are in Paris, three sailors on a furlough. They see the sights, but have their sights set on getting to know three girls, including Colette d'Avril, a nightclub singer, and Suzzane Sorrel, who has just had her purse snatched.

Each is in for a surprise. Joe finds out that Colette is Janie Mitchell, a girl from Brooklyn. She also is raising several orphans at home with financial aid from a male benefactor. Al, meanwhile, learns that Suzzane is a high-society lady who lives in a mansion.

Complications occur when Suzzane makes a play for Joe, giving him a kiss that is photographed and appears in the next day's newspapers. Janie is not happy about that, but is grateful when the sailors organize a fund-raiser for the kids after her benefactor's death. All the boys need to get back to their ship, but promise they will be back.

Cast 
Tony Curtis as Joe Maxwell
Gloria DeHaven as Colette d'Avril / Jane Mitchell
Gene Nelson as Al Howard
Corinne Calvet as Suzzane Sorrel
Paul Gilbert as Davy Jones

References

External links

1954 films
Films directed by Richard Quine
Universal Pictures films
1950s musical comedy films
1954 romantic comedy films
American musical comedy films
American romantic musical films
1950s romantic musical films
1950s English-language films
1950s American films